The Northern Nevada 4A Region is a part of the Nevada Interscholastic Activities Association, governing the northern half of Nevada for high school athletics.  The Northern 4A league is the large-school level, which has schools with enrollments of 1,200 and higher.  The region is split into two leagues.  The High Desert League and the Sierra League.  Both leagues are divided by proximity with the High Desert encompassing the schools north of Mill Street in Reno, while the schools in the Sierra League are south of Mill Street.

Current members

Affiliate Members 
Due to few schools participating in certain sports in the 3A level, some schools play in the 4A as their only option.  Schools who compete in various sports such as tennis, swimming and skiing are Fernley, Incline, Lowry, North Tahoe, Truckee, Sage Ridge and Sparks.

Rivalries 
Carson and Douglas- Known as the battle for the Carson Valley.
Reed and Spanish Springs- These two are the only 4A schools in Sparks.
North Valleys and Spanish Springs- The battle in the desert.  Both schools opened in the same year, 2001.
Bishop Manogue High School, Damonte High School, and Galena High School -  The battle of South Reno.
Reno High School and Bishop Manogue High School - The battle of the oldest schools in the area.
South Tahoe and North Tahoe- The Battle of the Lake
North Valleys High School and Hug High School-The Valley Cup

See also
Sunrise 4A Region
Sunset 4A Region
Northern Nevada 3A Region
Southern Nevada 2A Region

Nevada high school sports conferences